Schaanwald is one of four railway stations in Liechtenstein. It is located in the village of Schaanwald, in Mauren municipality. The station is currently disused and not served by any train service.

History

The station opened in 1902. It was staffed until 1988. Over time the number of trains stopping at the station diminished considerably. From 2010 until 2012 only one train per day stopped here. Since 2013 the station is no longer serviced.

Overview

Customs
Schaanwald, when used, is for customs purposes, a border station for passengers arriving from Austria. Liechtenstein is in a customs union with Switzerland. Customs checks may be performed in the station or on board trains by Swiss officials. Systematic passport controls were abolished when Liechtenstein joined the Schengen Area in 2011.

Gallery

See also
Schaan-Vaduz railway station
Forst Hilti railway station
Nendeln railway station
Rail transport in Liechtenstein
Railway stations in Liechtenstein

References

External links

Railway stations in Liechtenstein
Railway stations opened in 1902